Charles Dufresny, Sieur de la Rivière (1648 – 6 October 1724) was a French playwright.

Biography 
Dufresny was born in Paris. The allegation that his grandfather was an illegitimate son of Henry IV procured him the liberal patronage of Louis XIV, who gave him the post of valet de chambre, and affixed his name to many lucrative privileges. Dufresny's expensive habits neutralized all efforts to enrich him, and as if to furnish a piquant commentary on the proverb that poverty makes us acquainted with strange bedfellows, he married, as his second wife, a washerwoman, in discharge of her bill a whimsicality which supplied Alain-René Lesage with an episode in Le Diable boiteux (1707), and was made the subject of a comedy by J.-M. Deschamps (Charles Rivière Dufresny, ou le mariage impromptu).  He died in Paris.

His plays, destitute for the most part of all higher qualities, abound in sprightly wit and pithy sayings. In the six volumes of his Théatre (Paris, 1731), some of the best are L'Esprit de contradiction (1700), Le Double Veuvage (1701), La Joueuse (1709), La Coquette de village (1715), La Réconciliation normande (1719)
and Le Mariage fait et rompu (1721). A volume of Poésies diverses, two volumes of Nouvelles historiques (1692), and Les Amusements sérieux et comiques d'un Siamois (1705), a work to which Montesquieu was indebted for the idea of his Lettres persanes, complete the list of Dufresny's writings.

The best edition of his works is that of 1747 (4 vols.). His Théatre was edited (1882) by Georges d'Heylli.

His comedies include:
1692: L'Opéra de campagne 
1692: Le Négligent
1697: Les fées, ou Contes de ma mère l'oye 
1697: Le Chevalier joueur
1699: La Malade sans maladie
1699: La Noce interrompue 
1700: L'Esprit de contradiction 
1701: Le Double Veuvage
1703: Le Faux Honnête-Homme
1708: Le Jaloux honteux 
1709: La Joueuse 
1715: La Coquette de village, ou Le lot supposé 
1719: Le Dédit
1719: La Réconciliation normande 
1721: Le Mariage fait et rompu, ou l'hôtesse de Marseille 
1731: Le Faux Sincère

He also wrote short stories: , Le Puits de la vérité, histoire gauloise (1698), Amusements sérieux et comiques (Paris, 1699, in-12, Second edition augmented, 1707)? A great part of his Œuvres was collected by d'Alençon, in six volumes in 12° (1731, in 4 volumes in-8° corrected 1747, 1779). Auger published his Œuvres choisies (1801, 2 vol. in-18) and the last edition of his Théâtre dates back to 1881.

Studies 
 Les Dominos, comédie inédite, en un acte, en vers libres publiée par Jean Vic. Paris, Hachette, 1917
 Amusements sérieux et comiques, Éd. Vic, Jean, Paris, Bossard, 1921,  Édition originale (1699) Read online

References

Bibliography 
 Jean Vic, Les idées de Charles Rivière Dufresny, 2 volumes, Paris, Hachette, 1916-1917
 Georges Jamati, La Querelle du Joueur ; Regnard et Dufresny, Paris, Messein, 1936
 François Moureau, Dufresny, auteur dramatique : 1657-1724, Paris Klincksieck, 1979
 François Moureau, Le Mercure galant de Dufresny (1710-1714), ou, Le journalisme à la mode, Oxford Voltaire Foundation at the Taylor Institution, 1982

External links 
 Charles du Fresny on data.bnf.fr
 
 

1648 births
1724 deaths
Writers from Paris
French chansonniers
17th-century French dramatists and playwrights
18th-century French dramatists and playwrights
17th-century French poets
18th-century French poets
17th-century French male writers
18th-century French male writers